Woronora, an electoral district of the Legislative Assembly in the Australian state of New South Wales, had two incarnations, from 1894 to 1904 and from 1973 to 1988.


Election results

Elections in the 1980s

1984

1981

Elections in the 1970s

1978

1976

1973

1904 - 1973

Elections in the 1900s

1901

Elections in the 1890s

1898

1895

1894

Notes

References

New South Wales state electoral results by district